The 1965 Cork Junior Football Championship was the 67th staging of the Cork Junior A Football Championship since its establishment by Cork County Board in 1895. The championship ran from 24 October to 12 December 1965.

The final was played on 12 December 1965 at the Castle Grounds in Macroom, between Na Piarsaigh and Dohenys, in what was their first ever meeting in the final. Na Piarsaigh won the match by 1-03 to 0-04 to claim their first ever championship title.

Qualification

Results

Quarter-finals

Semi-finals

Final

References

1965 in Irish sport
Cork Junior Football Championship